La vereda del destino (The Sidewalk of Destiny in English), is the first book of the Uruguayan Horacio López Usera.

Review 
This book published in 2006 won the Premio Bartolomé Hidalgo revelation, and was a great surprise in the Feria del libro de Uruguay (Uruguay the Book Exhibition). Horacio López tells his experience from a perspective that is naturally very personal, observing, with rigour and a critical tone, the time period that she lived through from infancy to adolescence. In 2009 a pocket edition was published.

References 

2006 books
Uruguayan books
Spanish-language books
Autobiographies
Premio Bartolomé Hidalgo